Roman Matys (born July 28, 1978) is a Ukrainian public figure, human rights activist entrepreneur, economist, marketer, and investment expert. President of the NGO "International Investment Office". Head of the Investment Policy Department of the Lviv Regional Administration from 2016 to 2021.

Public activity 
Roman Matys is the founder of the public initiative “They'll Understand Either Way”, which since 2012 defends the rights of Ukrainian-speaking population to access information in their native language.

Roman Matys is the initiator and co-author of the Law “On the Ukrainian language as official”

Thanks to the strategy of Roman Matys "Lviv region - the factory of Europe" and the work of his team, in five years it was possible to launch several hundred enterprises in Lviv region, to create tens of thousands of jobs and to make certain industries, such as the automobile industry, dominant in the region.

See also 
 Committee of the Verkhovna Rada on issues of European integration

References 

1978 births
21st-century Ukrainian economists
Ukrainian language activists
Living people
People from Sambir